This is a list of schools in Germany sorted by Specialization.

STEM 
Saxony
 Martin-Andersen-Nexö-Gymnasium Dresden
Thuringia
 Carl-Zeiss-Gymnasium Jena

Languages 
Thuringia
 Salzmannschule Schnepfenthal

Sports 
Baden-Württemberg
 Helmholtz-Gymnasium Heidelberg

Arts 
Saxony
 Kreuzschule Dresden
 Sächsisches Landesgymnasium für Musik "Carl Maria von Weber", Dresden
 Thomasschule zu Leipzig

Schools for gifted children 
Baden-Württemberg
 Landesgymnasium für Hochbegabte Schwäbisch Gmünd
Bavaria
 Maria-Theresia-Gymnasium Munich
Saxony
 Landesschule Sankt Afra Meißen
Saxony-Anhalt
 Landesschule Pforta

See also
Education in Germany

 
Specialist